The International Player Pathway Program (IPPP) is a program run by the National Football League (NFL) to increase the number of non-American and Canadian players in the NFL. The program was formed as part of the NFL's strategy to grow globally as it provides athletes with the opportunity to play in the league which will increase the pool of talent and ultimately drive fan growth globally.

Background
The International Player Pathway Program was not the first initiative by the NFL to introduce foreign talent into its pool of players and neither is it, as yet, the longest running. The first such program was the NFL International Development Practice Squad Program that ran between 2004 and 2009. Following a short hiatus of seven years there was a single incarnation of NFL Undiscovered in 2016 and building immediately on the success of that trial the IPPP was instituted in 2017.

NFL International Development Practice Squad Program
The NFL International Practice Squad Program was an initiative run by the NFL in which selected players from outside the United States or Canada were assigned to the practice squads of NFL teams. The program began in 2004 and was concluded five years later in 2009 but during that time many players from a multitude of nations were given the opportunity to play in the NFL or other professional football leagues like the Arena Football League, the United Football League and the Canadian Football League.

NFL Undiscovered
Two British-born former NFL players Aden Durde (NFLUK head of football development) and two-time Super Bowl winner Osi Umenyiora were concerned that there were no clear pathways into the NFL for players who had not gone to high-school and/or college in the United States, and, as a result, the NFL was potentially missing out on some exceptional players. Wanting to remedy this, in early 2016, they used their personal and professional contacts from their time in the NFL to create a training program and to set-up meetings and try-outs with NFL teams for a small number of specially selected football players. These players' potential had been scouted primarily by watching YouTube videos. The initial group of players all lived, worked and played amateur football in Europe. At the time, the program was not yet officially named the International Player Pathway, but it was fully sanctioned and supported by the NFL. Additionally, the League had commissioned a mini-series documentary to be made, called NFL Undiscovered, that followed the participants of the program.

In 2017 the IPP was implemented with systems for choosing which division sponsors the program annually, as well as special regulations applying to the teams being assigned the players. The program has grown every year since its launch and, as of 2020, more than half (19 of 32) of all NFL teams have signed international players as a direct result of the program.

Eligibility
In 2017, potential applicants to NFL Undiscovered were asked to meet specific requirements and were advised to follow a particular application process. Some of these criteria have either changed over time or there is some discretion applied during the selection process, as not all the athletes that have come through the program in the intervening years meet all of the following criteria.
 age 24 or younger 
 out of high school (or equivalent) for at least four years
 did not play American football at a US college
 ability to speak English
 not a citizen of the US or Canada
 must be available and eligible to travel to the US for two months from the first week in March

Roster regulations
The NFL has specific regulations for players that sign through the IPP. The teams to which each IPP player is assigned are allowed 91 players on their off-season rosters, one more than those teams that are not participating in the IPP that year. At the point when these rosters need to be cut to 53 (at the end of pre-season), the participating teams must decide the status of their IPP players.

First, the team can keep their IPP player on their 53-man roster. If they waive the player, he goes through the NFL's waiver system, which allows him to be claimed by another team. If he clears waivers, the team can sign the player to their practice squad. If they do, they may elect to take an exemption for the IPP player, giving them an extra spot on their practice squad. If they utilize the exemption, that player cannot be signed to the active roster of any team during the season. If the exemption is declined, the player is treated like any other practice squad player, and can be promoted to a team's active roster. If the player chooses to sign with a team other than the one to which he was assigned, that team may not claim the exemption.

Notable participants

Accurate as of the 2023 NFL season

See also
 Foreign players in the National Football League

References

National Football League